Midtown is an underground metro station in Atlanta, Georgia, serving the Red and Gold lines of the Metropolitan Atlanta Rapid Transit Authority (MARTA) rail system. Located in Midtown Atlanta, 5,644 daily fares were collected at the gates as of 2013.

It provides access to the Midtown business and financial district, The Federal Reserve Bank of Atlanta, Margaret Mitchell House, Georgia Tech, and Piedmont Park. It provides connecting bus service to Cumberland Mall, Georgia Tech, Emory University, Emory Decatur Hospital, Grady Memorial Hospital, The District at Howell Mill, Atlanta Medical Center, Ansley Mall, Lindbergh Center, Atlanta Botanical Garden, and Turner Broadcasting headquarters.

Station layout

Bus routes

The station is served by the following MARTA bus routes:
 Route 12 - Howell Mill Road / Cumberland Mall
 Route 14 - 14th Street / Blandtown
 Route 36 - North Decatur Road / Virginia-Highland

Connection to other transit systems
CobbLinc
Ride Gwinnett
Georgia Regional Transportation Authority

References

External links
MARTA Station Page
nycsubway.org Atlanta page
 Peachtree Place entrance from Google Maps Street View
 10th Street entrance from Google Maps Street View

Gold Line (MARTA)
Red Line (MARTA)
Metropolitan Atlanta Rapid Transit Authority stations
Railway stations in the United States opened in 1982
Railway stations in Atlanta
1982 establishments in Georgia (U.S. state)